Interzone is an album by American composer John Zorn developed to pay tribute to the influence of writers William S. Burroughs and Brion Gysin and released on Zorn's Tzadik label in 2010.

Reception
The Allmusic review by Thom Jurek awarded the album 4 stars stating "Interzone is one of John Zorn's more ambitious multi-part pieces. While some claim this is a return to the file card process and recordings like Spillane, Interzone feels different: it's more an ensemble work even when it travels through genres, dynamics, textures, and musical geographies".

Track listing
All compositions by John Zorn
  Interzone 1 - 15:20
  Interzone 2 - 27:37
  Interzone 3 - 11:21

Personnel
 Ikue Mori: Electronics
 John Zorn: Saxophone
 Marc Ribot: Guitars, Banjo, Sintir, Cümbüs
 Kenny Wollesen: Drums, Vibes, Chimes, Typani, Wollesonics, Percussion 
 Cyro Baptista: Percussion 
 John Medeski: Keyboards 
 Trevor Dunn: Long assortment of Bass

References

2010 albums
John Zorn albums
Albums produced by John Zorn
Tzadik Records albums